This is a List of rivers in Alaska, which are at least fifth-order according to the Strahler method of stream classification, and an incomplete list of otherwise-notable rivers and streams. Alaska has more than 12,000 rivers, and thousands more streams and creeks. According to United States Geological Survey Geographic Names Information System, Alaska has about 9,728 officially named rivers, creeks, and streams. The length of the river is given if it is available from the United States Geological Survey Geographic Names Information System (GNIS).

By drainage basin
This list is arranged by drainage basin, with respective tributaries ordered from mouth to source, and indented under their downstream parent's name.

Arctic Ocean
Firth River – 
Kongakut River – 
Aichilik River – 
Jago River – 
Okpilak River – 
Hulahula River – 
Sadlerochit River – 
Canning River – 
Marsh Fork Canning River – 
Shaviovik River – 
Kavik River – 
Kadleroshilik River – 
Sagavanirktok River – 
Ivishak River – 
Echooka River – 
Ribdon River – 
Atigun River – 
Kuparuk River – 
Toolik River – 
Colville River – 
Itkillik River – 
Anaktuvuk River – 
Nanushuk River – 
Chandler River – 
Siksikpuk River – 
Ayiyak River – 
Killik River – 
Okokmilaga River – 
Oolamnagavik River – 
Kurupa River – 
Awuna River – 
Etivluk River – 
Nigu River – 
Ipnavik River – 
Kuna River – 
Kiligwa River
Nuka River – 
Fish Creek – 
Ikpikpuk River – 
Titaluk River – 
Price River – 
Topagoruk River – 
Meade River – 
Usuktuk River – 
Kuk River – 
Kungok River – 
Ivisaruk River – 
Avalik River – 
Ketik River – 
Kaolak River – 
Utukok River – 
Kokolik River – 
Kukpowruk River – 
Pitmegea River – 
Kukpuk River – 
Ipewik River –

Bering Strait
Kivalina River – 
Wulik River – 
Noatak River – 
Agashashok River – 
Eli River – 
Kelly River – 
Kugururok River – 
Nimiuktuk River
Anisak River – 
Cutler River – 
Imelyak River – 
Aniuk River – 
Kobuk River – 
Squirrel River – 
Salmon River – 
Ambler River – 
Kogoluktuk River – 
Mauneluk River – 
Pah River – 
Reed River – 
Selawik River – 
Kugarak River – 
Tagagawik River – 
Buckland River – 
Kiwalik River – 
Kugruk River – 
Inmachuk River - 
Goodhope River – 
Nugnugaluktuk River – 
Agiapuk River – 
American River – 
Kuzitrin River – 
Kruzgamepa River - 
Grand Central River - 
Kougarok River – 
Noxapaga River – 
Feather River – 
Bluestone River – 
Sinuk River
Cripple River
Penny River – 
Snake River
Nome River
Fish River – 
Niukluk River – 
Casadepaga River – 
Tubutulik River – 
Koyuk River – 
Inglutalik River – 
Negromoon Creek
Ungalik River – 
Shaktoolik River – 
Unalakleet River – 
South River 
North River – 
Chiroskey River – 
Old Woman River
Pastolik River –

Yukon River Basin
Yukon River – 
Archuelinguk River - 
Andreafsky River – 
East Fork Andreafsky River – 
Atchuelinguk River – 
Reindeer River – 
Innoko River – 
Paimiut Slough – 
Reindeer River – 
Iditarod River – 
Yetna River – 
Mud River – 
Dishna River – 
Bonasila River – 
Stuyahok River – 
Anvik River – 
Khotol River – 
Nulato River – 
Koyukuk River – 
Hammond River - 
Gisasa River – 
Kateel River – 
Dulbi River – 
Huslia River – 
Hogatza River – 
Indian River – 
Kanuti River – 
Kanuti Kilolitna River – 
Alatna River – 
South Fork Koyukuk River – 
Fish Creek – 
Jim River – 
John River – 
Wild River – 
North Fork Koyukuk River – 
Tinayguk River – 
Middle Fork Koyukuk River – 
Yuki River – 
Melozitna River – 
Little Melozitna River – 
Big Creek- 
Nowitna River – 
Sulatna River – 
Lost River - 
Little Mud River-
Big Mud River - 
Titna River – 
Telsitna River - 
Sethkokna River – 
Sulukna River-
Susulatna River – 
Bering Creek-
Tozitna River – 
Tanana River – 
Chitanana River – 
Cosna River – 
Zitiana River – 
Kantishna River – 
Toklat River – 
Sushana River-
Bearpaw River - 
Moose Creek
Lake Creek
John Hansen Creek
McKinley River – 
Birch Creek – 
Muddy River – 
Foraker River – 
Herron River - 
Tolovana River – 
Chatanika River - 
Tatalina River-
Totchaket Slough-
west middle river / East middle river  - 
Nenana River – 
Seventeenmile slough - 
Teklanika River – 
Totatlanika River-
Wood River – 
Tatlanika Creek-
Chena River –   
Little Chena river - 
Salcha River – 
Little Delta River – 
Delta Creek – 
Delta River – 
Goodpaster River – 
Gerstle River - 
Volkmar River - 
Healy River -  
Johnson River - 
Robertson River  - 
Tok River – 
Tetlin River – 
Kalukna River - 
Kalutna River - 
Chisana River – 
Nabesna River – 
Cheslina River - 
Hess Creek – 
Troublesome Creek (Hess Creek)
Ray River – 
Dall River – 
Hodzana River – 
Beaver Creek – 
Hadweenzic River – 
Birch Creek – 
Preacher Creek – 
Chandalar River – 
East Fork Chandalar River – 
North Fork East Fork Chandalar River – 
Wind River – 
Junjik River – 
Middle Fork Chandalar River – 
North Fork Chandalar River – 
Christian River – 
Porcupine River – 
Grass River – 
Little Black River – 
Draanjik River – 
Salmon Fork Black River – 
Grayling Fork Black River – 
Sheenjek River – 
Koness River – 
Coleen River – 
Old Crow River – 
Charley River – 
Kandik River – 
Nation River – 
Seventymile River – 
Tatonduk River – 
Fortymile River – 
North Fork Fortymile River – 
Middle Fork Fortymile River – 
South Fork Fortymile River – 
Mosquito Fork – 
Dennison Fork – 
Sixtymile River – 
White River – 
Ladue River – 
Beaver Creek –

Bering Sea

Black River – 
Kun River – 
Kokechik River – 60 miles (Kashunuk distributary)
Kashunuk River – 225 miles (Yukon distributary)
Manokinak River – 
Azun River – 
Joshua Green River - 
Ninglick River – 
Izaviknek River – 
Kolavinarak River – 
Kuskokwim River – 
Eek River – 
Johnson River – 
Gweek River – 
Kwethluk River – 
Kisaralik River – 
Tuluksak River – 
Aniak River – 
George River – 
Holitna River – 
Hoholitna River – 
Stony River – 
Swift River – 
Takotna River – 
Nixon Fork – 
Middle Fork Kuskokwim River – 
Big River – 
South Fork Kuskokwim River – 
East Fork Kuskokwim River – 
Slow Fork – 
Tonzona River – 
North Fork Kuskokwim River – 
Swift Fork – 
Kanektok River – 
Arolik River – 
Goodnews River – 
Togiak River – 
Igushik River – 
Snake River – 
Nushagak River – 
Wood River – 
Kokwok River – 
Mulchatna River – 
Stuyahok River – 
Koktuli River
Chilikadrotna River – 
Nuyakuk River – 
Tikchik River – 
King Salmon River – 
Kvichak River – 
Alagnak River – 
Newhalen River – 
Chulitna River – 
Tlikakila River – 
Naknek River – 
Savonoski River – 
American Creek – 
Egegik River (also Ugaguk) – 
King Salmon River – 
Dago Creek – 
Ugashik River – 
King Salmon River – 
Dog Salmon River – 
Cinder River – 
Meshik River – 
Caribou River (Alaska) –

Gulf of Alaska
Chignik River – 
Aniakchak River – 
Ayakulik River – 
Karluk River – 
Kamishak River – 
McNeil River – 
McArthur River – 
Chakachatna River – 
Beluga River – 

Susitna River – 
Yentna River – 
Kahiltna River – 
Skwentna River – 
Talachulitna River – 
Deshka River – 
Kroto Creek
Moose Creek
Talkeetna River – 
Chulitna River – 
Tokositna River – 
Oshetna River – 
Tyone River – 
Maclaren River – 
Little Susitna River – 
Matanuska River – 
Kings River - 
Chickaloon River – 
Knik River – 
Eklutna River – 
Eagle River – 
Ship Creek – 
Twentymile River - 
Placer River - 
Chickaloon River – 
Swanson River – 
Kenai River – 
Snow River - 
Skilak River - 
Kasilof River – 
Ninilchik River – 
Nelchina River – 
Little Nelchina River – 
Anchor River – 
Fox River – 
Martin River – 
Lowe River – 
Copper River – 
Martin River – 
Bremner River – 
Tasnuna River
Tiekel River – 
Chitina River – 
Nizina River – 
Tana River – 
Slana River – 
Tonsina River – 
Klutina River – 
Tazlina River – 
Gulkana River – 
Gakona River – 
Chistochina River –

Southeast Alaska
Bering River – 
Duktoth River – 
Yahtse River
Alsek River – 
Endicott River – 
Chilkat River – 
Tsirku River – 
Klehini River – 
Chilkoot River – 
Taiya River – 
Eagle River (Favorite Channel) – 
Taku River – 
Whiting River – 
Stikine River – 
Eagle River (Bradfield Canal) – 
King Salmon River – 
Craig River enters Canada to join the Iskut
Unuk River – 
Chickamin River – 
Kelsall River
Skagway River
Porcupine Creek (Porcupine River tributary)
Blue River
Behm River

Alphabetically

Agashashok River
Agiapuk River
Aichilik River
Alagnak River
Alatna River
Alsek River
Ambler River
American Creek
American River
Anaktuvuk River
Anchor River
Andreafsky River
Aniak River
Aniakchak River
Anisak River
Aniuk River
Anvil Creek
Another River
Anvik River
Arolik River
Atchuelinguk River
Atigun River
Avalik River
Awuna River
Ayakulik River
Ayiyak River
Azun River
Babel River
Bearpaw River
Beaver Creek (Yukon River tributary)
Beaver Creek (White River tributary, Alaska)
Behm River
Beluga River
Bering River
Big River
Birch Creek (Kantishna River tributary)
Birch Creek (Yukon River tributary)
Black River (Yukon Delta)
Blue River
Bonasila River
Bremner River
Buckland River
Canning River
Caribou River
Chakachatna River
Chandalar River
Chandler River
Charley River
Chatanika River
Chena River
Chickaloon River (Matanuska River tributary)
Chickaloon River (Chickaloon Bay)
Chickamin River
Chignik River
Chilikadrotna River
Chilkat River
Chilkoot River
Chisana River
Chistochina River
Chitanana River
Chitina River
Christian River
Chulitna River (Lake Clark)
Chulitna River (Susitna River tributary)
Cinder River
Ciissinraq River
Clearwater River
Coleen River
Colville River
Copper River
Cosna River
Cutler River
Dago Creek
Dall River
Delta Creek
Delta River
Demon Creek
Deshka River
Dick Dale Creek
Dishna River
Dog Salmon River
Draanjik River
Duktoth River
Dulbi River
Eagle River
Echooka River
Eek River
Egegik River
Eklutna River
Eli River
Endicott River
Espenberg River
Etivluk River
Firth River
Fish Creek (Arctic Ocean)
Fish Creek (Koyukuk River tributary)
Fish River
Foraker River
Fortymile River
Fox River
Gakona River
George River
Gisasa River
Goodhope River
Goodnews River
Goodpaster River
Grass River
Gulkana River
Gweek River
Hadweenzic River
Hammond River
Hess Creek
Hodzana River
Hogatza River
Hoholitna River
Holitna River
Hulahula River
Huslia River
Iditarod River
Igushik River
Ikpikpuk River
Imelyak River
Inaru River
Indian River
Inglutalik River
Inmachuk River 
Innoko River
Ipewik River
Ipnavik River
Itkillik River
Ivisaruk River
Ivishak River
Izaviknek River
Jago River
Jim River
John River
Johnson River
Johnson River
Joshua Green River
Junjik River
Kadleroshilik River
Kahiltna River
Kamishak River
Kandik River
Kanektok River
Kantishna River
Kanuti Kilolitna River
Kanuti River
Kaolak River
Karluk River
Kashunuk River
Kasilof River

Kateel River
Kavik River
Kelsall River
Kelly River
Kenai River
Ketik River
Khotol River
Kiligwa River
Killik River
King Salmon River (Nushagak River tributary)
King Salmon River (Egegik River tributary)
King Salmon River (Ugashik River tributary)
Kisaralik River
Kivalina River
Kiwalik River
Klehini River
Klutina River
Knik River
Kobuk River
Kogoluktuk River
Kokechik River
Kokolik River
Koktuli River
Kokwok River
Kolavinarak River
Koness River
Kongakut River
Kougarok River
Koyuk River
Koyukuk River
Kugarak River
Kugruk River
Kugururok River
Kuk River
Kukpowruk River
Kukpuk River
Kun River
Kuna River
Kungok River
Kuparuk River
Kurupa River
Kuskokwim River
Kuzitrin River
Kvichak River
Kwethluk River
Ladue River
Lake Creek
Little Black River
Little Delta River
Little Melozitna River
Little Nelchina River
Little Susitna River
Louse Creek
Lowe River
MacLaren River
Manokinak River
Martin River

Matanuska River
Mauneluk River
McArthur River
McKinley River
McNeil River
Meade River
Melozitna River
Meshik River
Moose Creek
Mud River
Muddy River
Mulchatna River
Nabesna River
Naknek River
Nanushuk River
Nation River
Nelchina River
Nenana River
Newhalen River
Nigu River
Nimiuktuk River
Ninglick River
Ninilchik River
Niukluk River
Nizina River
Noatak River
North River
Nowitna River
Noxapaga River
Nugnugaluktuk River
Nuka River
Nulato River
Nushagak River
Nuyakuk River
Okokmilaga River
Okpilak River
Old Crow River
Oolamnagavik River
Oshetna River
Pah River
Paimiut Slough
Pastolik River
Pitmegea River
Porcupine River
Porcupine Creek
Preacher Creek
Price River
Quail Creek
Queer Creek
Ray River
Reed River
Reindeer River (Yukon River tributary)
Reindeer River (Paimiut Slough)
Ribdon River
Sadlerochit River
Sagavanirktok River
Salcha River
Salmon River (Kobuk River tributary)
Savonoski River
Selawik River
Sethkokna River
Seventymile River
Shaktoolik River
Shaviovik River
Sheenjek River
Ship Creek
Siksikpuk River
Sixtymile River
Skagway River
Skwentna River
Snake River
Snow River
Squirrel River
Stikine River
Stony River
Stuyahok River (Bonasila River tributary)
Stuyahok River (Mulchatna River tributary)
Sulatna River
Susitna River
Susulatna River
Swanson River
Swift River
Tagagawik River
Taiya River
Takotna River
Taku River
Talachulitna River
Talkeetna River
Tana River

Tanana River
Tasnuna River
Tatonduk River
Tazlina River
Teklanika River
Tetlin River
Tiekel River
Tikchik River
Tinayguk River
Titaluk River
Titna River
Tlikakila River
Togiak River
Tok River
Toklat River
Tokositna River
Tolovana River
Tonsina River
Tonzona River
Toolik River
Topagoruk River
Tozitna River
Tsirku River
Tubutulik River
Tuluksak River
Twentymile River in Chugach National Forest
Tyone River
Ugashik River
Unalakleet River
Ungalik River
Unuk River
Usuktuk River
Utukok River
Wetbutt Creek
White River
Whiting River
Wild River
Wind River
Wood River (Tanana River tributary)
Wood River (Nushagak River tributary)
Wulik River
Yahtse River
Yentna River
Yetna River
Yuki River
Yukon River
Zitiana River

See also 
List of islands of Alaska
List of lakes of Alaska
List of rivers of the United States
List of waterfalls of Alaska

Notes

USGS GNIS named streams by Borough or Census Area:

References

General references 

Alaska
Rivers